Erie Township is a township in Becker County, Minnesota, United States. The population was 1,642 as of the 2010 census.

History
Erie Township was organized in 1878. It was named after Erie County, New York, the native home territory of its early settlers.

Geography

Major highway
  Minnesota State Highway 34

Lakes
 Cotton Lake (southwest three-quarters)
 Fisher Lake
 Five Lake (vast majority)
 Fox Lake
 Howe Lake
 Irish Lake
 Loon Lake (southeast half)
 Neuner Lake
 Perch Lake
 Pickerel Lake (vast majority)
 Rice Lake
 Schultz Lake
 St Patrick Lake

Adjacent townships
 Holmesville Township (north)
 Height of Land Township (east)
 Silver Leaf Township (southeast)
 Burlington Township (south)
 Lake View Township (southwest)
 Detroit Township (west)
 Richwood Township (northwest)

Demographics

As of the census of 2000, there were 1,621 people, 596 households, and 463 families residing in the township. There were 823 housing units at an average density of 25.6/sq mi (9.9/km2). The racial makeup of the township was 95.37% White, 0.06% African American, 1.73% Native American, 0.12% Asian, 0.19% from other races, and 2.53% from two or more races. Hispanic or Latino of any race were 0.31% of the population.

There were 596 households, out of which 36.6% had children under the age of 18 living with them, 68.3% were married couples living together, 5.5% had a female householder with no husband present, and 22.3% were non-families. 18.1% of all households were made up of individuals, and 6.7% had someone living alone who was 65 years of age or older.  The average household size was 2.71 and the average family size was 3.10.

In the township the population was spread out, with 29.4% under the age of 18, 6.4% from 18 to 24, 27.9% from 25 to 44, 25.5% from 45 to 64, and 10.9% who were 65 years of age or older.  The median age was 38 years. For every 100 females, there were 104.2 males.  For every 100 females age 18 and over, there were 104.3 males.

The median income for a household in the township was $43,024, and the median income for a family was $45,875. Males had a median income of $31,742 versus $19,167 for females. The per capita income for the township was $18,837.  About 2.5% of families and 4.2% of the population were below the poverty line, including 6.3% of those under age 18 and 3.3% of those age 65 or over.

References
 United States National Atlas
 United States Census Bureau 2007 TIGER/Line Shapefiles
 United States Board on Geographic Names (GNIS)

Townships in Becker County, Minnesota
Townships in Minnesota